Citrullus is a genus of seven species of desert vines, among which Citrullus lanatus (the watermelon) is an important crop.

Taxonomy
Molecular data, including sequences from the original collection of Momordica lanata made near Cape Town by C. P. Thunberg in 1773, show that what Thunberg collected is not what has been called Citrullus lanatus, the domesticated watermelon, since the 1930s. Although this error only occurred in 1930 (Bailey, Gentes Herbarum 2: 180–186), it has been perpetuated in hundreds of papers on the watermelon. In addition, there is an older name for the watermelon, Citrullus battich Forssk. (Fl. Aegypt.-Arab.: 167. Jun 1775), which would normally have the precedence over Momordica lanata Thunberg (Prodr. Pl. Cap.: 13. 1794). To solve this problem, it has been proposed to conserve the name Citrullus lanatus with a new type to preserve  the current sense of the name

Species
Citrullus consists of the following species and subspecies:

Citrullus amarus Schrad. – citron melon
Citrullus colocynthis (L.) Schrad. – colocynth
Citrullus ecirrhosus Cogn. – tendril-less melon
Citrullus lanatus (Thunb.) Matsum. & Nakai – desert watermelon
Citrullus lanatus subsp. vulgaris var. cordophanus (Ter-Avan.) Fursa
Citrullus lanatus var. lanatus
Citrullus mucosospermus (Fursa) Fursa – egusi melon
Citrullus naudinianus (Sond.) Hook.f.
Citrullus rehmii De Winter

References

External links

 Chomicki, G., and S. S. Renner. 2015. Watermelon origin solved with molecular phylogenetics including Linnaean material: Another example of museomics. New Phytologist 205(2): 526-532

Cucurbitaceae genera
Cucurbitoideae